Plain Love (Mandarin: qíng nóng dà dì, Cantonese: ching nung daai dei, "Everlasting Earth") was a television drama series produced by TVB. The series takes place in Republican China, focusing on the lives and trials of a servant family. The series was released overseas in 1994 before broadcasting on TVB Jade in 1995.

Plot 
The Kwan family are powerful and wealthy landowners of a village in Dunggun who tenant out their land to local farmers in return for crops. Their family consists of two elder sons, a daughter and a youngest son.

Lau Ah Choi is an orphan who through a series of unfortunate events ended up as a child bride of the youngest master (4th young master) of the Kwan's. Although, the 4th young mistress in name, Ah Choi is treated as the maid and personal servant to the 4th young master.

Ah Choi grew up to a beautiful and sensible young lady catching the attention of the lecherous eldest young master and studious second young master of the Kwan's.

After Kwan Tin Fook (關天福) attempted to rape Ah Choi. The Kwans notice their second eldest son Kwan Tim Jam (關天蔭) falling in love with her, they sentence her to be drowned in a basket. The ensuing grief drives one of the Fongs to commit suicide.

The villagers than despoil and raid the Kwan household. Noticing Tin Fook running away with his wealth, his relative Kwan Dai Mai (關大米) attacks him, but Tin Fook uses a flowerpot to crush his testicles so that he will escape. After some persuasion, the villagers instead restore the Kwans' household.

As a famine strikes the village, the father of the Fangs was killed as he tries to save his grandson from being snatched off. After some difficulty in the city, the Kwans return to the village. They force Lau Nga Choi (劉亞彩) to marry Fong Shu Gan (方樹根), who is elected as village headman. Shu Gan saves his village from starvation by bringing a cart of rice sacks, and ensues its prosperity.

Kwan Dai Mai and several villagers plan to drown a woman from the Kwan family in revenge for the drowning of Lap Cheun, but was persuaded against such actions. Having failed to avenge Lap Cheun, he leaves, with some coins for the Fongs. Then, Tim Jam returns from the city from a bout of gambling. Having been beaten up for failing to pay his expenses, Nga Choi pays for Tim Jam.

Kwan Tin Fook returns to the village, this time as an army leader, to seize his farm village back. He harasses Shu Gan and falsely accuses him of murder, and tries to rape Nga Choi.

Tin Fook conscripts the men of his village, including Shu Gan and Tim Jam into his army, amid protests and attempts by the Kwans to stop him. He sells off Shu Gan's son Fong Ah-Tin to Nanyang. Tin Fook himself was later killed in battle.

In the present day, Shu Gan and Nga Choi meet again by their old village, near a tree, after some counselling. Ah Tin returns by his car to meet them.

Cast 

 Gallen Lo Ka-Leung as Fong Shu Gan (方樹根), the main character of the series and father of Ah Tin. Worst enemy of Tin Fook.
 Kathy Chow Hoi-Mei as Lau Nga Choi (劉亞彩), Shu Gan's wife and mother of Ah Tin.
 Eddie Cheung Siu Fai as Kwan Tim Jam (關天蔭), the second oldest son of the Kwan family.
 Kwan Hoi-San as Kwan Hok Jyu (關學儒), the patriarch of the Kwan family.
 Wilson Tsui as Kwan Tin Fook (關天福), the entitled eldest son of the Kwan family, enemy of Shu Gan, and main antagonist.
 Tsui Ga-Bo as Tsiu Jeuk Lan (趙若蘭), Kwan Tin Fook's wife.
 Chan Pui-Saan as Fong Lap Cheun (方立春), the servant girl who was framed to be drowned in a basket.
 Wong Wai-Leung as Kwan Dai Mai or Dai Bao Mai (關大米, 大包米), the embittered relative of the Kwans.
 Florence Kwok as Jung Jyun Saan (鍾婉珊)

Sequel 

The 1999 series Plain Love II (茶是故鄉濃) is considered a sequel to this series, although it uses different characters.

TVB dramas
1999 Hong Kong television series debuts
1995 Hong Kong television series endings